Xanthograpta purpurascens is a moth of the family Noctuidae first described by George Hampson in 1910. It is found in Australia.

References

Acontiinae